The Franklin Pool and Leisure Centre is a Leisure Centre in Pukekohe, New Zealand. It is the home to the Franklin Bulls of the New Zealand National Basketball League, Which is known as "The Stockyard" during their games. On 17 May 2021, The New Zealand Breakers announced that they would play a regular season Australian National Basketball League Game on 28 May 2021 at the venue, as part of their 2021 New Zealand Tour. The Game saw the Illawarra Hawks beat the New Zealand Breakers by 11 points.

References

New Zealand Breakers
Indoor arenas in New Zealand
Basketball venues in New Zealand
Swimming venues in New Zealand